Eustylus is a neotropical genus of broad-nosed weevils in the subfamily Entiminae, tribe Eustylini.

Taxonomy 
Eustylus was described for the first time by Carl Johan Schönherr in 1843 (p. 40). The Central American species were treated by Champion. Marshall 1916 offers a key to most species.

Description 
One of the most salient features of Eustylus is its broad antennal scape, densely and uniformly covered by scales (see Fig. 7F in Girón 2020 ). Some species bear a spine on the inner margin of the profemur, which is unusual for eustylines. Most species are uniformly covered by brown scales forming different patterns; metallic green species are also found.

Distribution 
The genus Eustylus ranges from Mexico to Paraguay, with some species represented in the Caribbean

List of species 
Eustylus contains 26 described species:

 Eustylus aequus Marshall, 1916: 464: Brazil.
 Eustylus bodkini Marshall, 1916: 456: Colombia, Guyana, Venezuela.
 Eustylus chiriquensis Champion, 1911: 294: Panama.
 Eustylus cinericius Champion, 1911: 296: Guatemala.
 Eustylus ephippiatus Marshall, 1916: 458: Colombia.
 Eustylus funicularis Kirsch, 1874: 390: Bolivia, Peru.
 Eustylus grypsatus Boheman, 1843: 27: Mexico.
 Eustylus hybridus Rosenschoeld, 1840: 200: Guadeloupe, Saint Lucia.
 Eustylus inclusus Marshall, 1916: 461: Brazil.
 Eustylus magdalenae Marshall, 1926: 536: Colombia.
 Eustylus obliquefasciatus Marshall, 1916: 455: Venezuela.
 Eustylus puber Olivier, 1807: 367: Colombia, French Guiana, Guyana, Trinidad, Venezuela.
 Eustylus quadrigibbus Champion, 1911: 292: Mexico.
 Eustylus ruptus Champion, 1911: 293: Costa Rica, Panama.
 Eustylus scapularis Marshall, 1916: 464: Brazil.
 Eustylus setipennis Champion, 1911: 292: Guatemala.
 Eustylus sexguttatus Champion, 1911: 291: Panama.
 Eustylus simplex Marshall, 1916: 460: Colombia.
 Eustylus simulatus Marshall, 1916: 459: Colombia.
 Eustylus sordidus Marshall, 1916: 460: Colombia.
 Eustylus striatus Boheman, 1843: 42: Mexico.
 Eustylus subapterus Champion, 1911: 295: Guatemala, Mexico.
 Eustylus subfasciatus Voss, 1932: 40: Paraguay.
 Eustylus subguttatus Marshall, 1916: 462: Brazil.
 Eustylus subuittatus Marshall, 1916: 457: Venezuela.
 Eustylus veraepacis Champion, 1911: 294: Guatemala.

References 

Weevils